The Latino-Faliscan or Latinian languages form a group of the Italic languages within the Indo-European family. They were spoken by the Latino-Faliscan people of Italy who lived there from the early 1st millennium BCE.

Latin and Faliscan belong to the group, as well as two others often considered dialects of archaic Latin: Lanuvian and Praenestine.

As the power of Ancient Rome grew, Latin absorbed elements of the other languages and replaced Faliscan. The other variants went extinct as Latin became dominant. Latin in turn developed via Vulgar Latin into the Romance languages, now spoken by more than 800 million people, largely as a result of the influence of the Spanish, French and Portuguese Empires.

Linguistic description 
Latin and Faliscan have several features in common with other Italic languages:
The late Indo-European sequences /*ə, *eu/ have evolved into a, ou.
The Indo-European syllabic liquids /*l̥, *r̥/ have developed an epenthetic vowel o, giving Italic ol, or.
The Indo-European syllabic nasals /*m̥, *n̥/ have developed an epenthetic vowel e, giving Italic em, en.
They fricativised word-initial aspirated stops from Indo-European: /*bʰ, *dʰ, *gʰ/ > f, f, h.
They assimilated the sequence /*p...kʷ/ into kʷ...kʷ (Proto-Indo-European *penkʷe 'five' > Latin  quinque).

Latin and Faliscan also have characteristics not shared by other branches of Italic. They retain the Indo-European labiovelars /*kʷ, *gʷ/ as qu-, gu- (later becoming velar and semivocal), whereas in Osco-Umbrian they become labial p, b. Latin and Faliscan use the accusative suffix -d, seen in med ("me", accusative), which is absent in Osco-Umbrian. In addition, Latin displays evolution of ou into ū (Latin lūna < Proto-Italic *louksnā < PIE *lówksneh₂ "moon").

Phonology 
It is likely that the consonant inventory of Proto-Latino-Faliscan was basically identical to that of archaic Latin. Consonants not found in the Praeneste fibula are marked with an asterisk.
{| class="wikitable" style="text-align:center;"
! colspan="2"|
!Labial
!Alveolar
!Palatal
!Velar
!Labio-velar
!Glottal
|- 
! rowspan="2"|Plosives
! voiceless
| style="font-size:larger;" |
| style="font-size:larger;" |
| 
| style="font-size:larger;" |
| style="font-size:larger;" |
| 
|- 
! voiced
| style="font-size:larger;" |
| style="font-size:larger;" |
| 
| style="font-size:larger;" |
| style="font-size:larger;" |
| 
|- align="center"
! colspan="2"| Fricative
| style="font-size:larger;" |
| style="font-size:larger;" |
| 
| 
| 
| style="font-size:larger;" |
|- 
! colspan="2"| Sonorants
| 
| style="font-size:larger;" |
| style="font-size:larger;" |
| 
| style="font-size:larger;" |
| 
|- 
! colspan="2"| Nasal
| style="font-size:larger;" |
| style="font-size:larger;" |
| 
| 
| 
| 
|}
The /kʷ/ sound still existed in archaic Latin when the Latin alphabet was developed, since it gives rise to the minimum pair: quī /kʷī/ ("who", nominative) > cuī /ku.ī/ ("to whom", dative). Note that in other positions there is no distinction between diphthongs and hiatuses: for example, persuādere ("to persuade") is a diphthong but sua ("his"/"her") is a hiatus. For reasons of symmetry, it is quite possible that many sequences of gu in archaic Latin in fact represent a voiced labiovelar /gʷ/.

Description 
Indo-Europeanists initially assumed that the various Indo-European languages of ancient Italy belonged to one unitary family, like the Celtic or Germanic languages. This view probably originated with Antoine Meillet (1866–1936).

This unitary model, however, has been strongly criticised, first by Alois Walde (1869–1924). Decisive counter-arguments were given by Vittore Pisani (1899–1990) and Giacomo Devoto (1897–1974). Both proposed that the Italic languages could be grouped into two distinct branches of Indo-European. This view, though reformulated in the years following the Second World War, has become dominant. Nonetheless, how exactly the languages are to be grouped, how they entered Italy, and how they became distinct, are open questions in historical linguistics.

See also 

Italic peoples

References

Notes

Further reading

Bakkum, Gabriël C. L. M. 2009. The Latin Dialect of the Ager Faliscus: 150 Years of Scholarship. Part 1. Amsterdam: Amsterdam University Press.
Baldi, Philip. 2002. The foundations of Latin. Berlin: de Gruyter.
Clackson, James, and Geoffrey Horrocks. 2007. The Blackwell history of the Latin language. Malden, MA: Blackwell.
Giacomelli, Roberto. 1979. "Written and spoken language in latin-faliscan and greek-messapic." Journal of Indo-European Studies 7 no. 3–4: 149-75.
Mercado, Angelo. 2012. Italic Verse: A Study of the Poetic Remains of Old Latin, Faliscan, and Sabellic. Innsbruck: Institut für Sprachen und Literaturen der Universität Innsbruck.
Palmer, Leonard R. 1961. The Latin language. London: Faber and Faber.
Joseph, Brian D., and Rex E. Wallace. 1991. "Is faliscan a local latin patois?" Diachronica: International Journal for Historical Linguistics/Revue Internationale Pour La Linguistique Historiqu 8, no. 2: 159–86.
 Rigobianco, Luca. 2019. Faliscan. Language, Writing, Epigraphy. Aelaw Booklet 7. Zaragoza.
 Rigobianco, Luca. 2020. «Falisco», Palaeohispanica 20: 299-333.

External links 
 "Languages and Cultures of Ancient Italy. Historical Linguistics and Digital Models", Project fund by the Italian Ministry of University and Research (P.R.I.N. 2017)